Victor Iamandi (February 15, 1891 – 26 November 1940) was a Romanian politician who served as the Romanian Minister of Justice in 1938–1939, in several successive cabinets.

He was born in Hodora, Iași County, the son of Ion and Lucreția Iamandi. He studied law at the University of Iași, graduating in 1914. From 1916 to 1922 he was a history teacher at the National High School in Iași. After he joined the National Liberal Party, he became a deputy in the lower house of the Parliament of Romania. 

Iamandi was assassinated at Jilava Prison, near Bucharest, by members of the Iron Guard during the Jilava Massacre, due to the measures he took against the Guard during his ministerial service.

A gymnasium in Munteni bears his name.

References

External links

1891 births
1940 deaths
People from Iași County
Alexandru Ioan Cuza University alumni
National Liberal Party (Romania) politicians
National Renaissance Front politicians
Members of the Chamber of Deputies (Romania)
Romanian Ministers of Culture
Romanian Ministers of Justice
Romanian Ministers of Education
Camarilla (Carol II of Romania)
People murdered in Romania
People assassinated by the Romanian Iron Guard
Romanian schoolteachers